Beddomeia is a genus of very small freshwater snails that have a gill and an operculum, aquatic operculate gastropod mollusks in the family Tateidae.

Species
Species within the genus Beddomeia include:

 
Beddomeia acheronensis
Beddomeia acheronensis absona
Beddomeia acheronensis acheronensis
Beddomeia angulata Ponder & Clark, 1993
Beddomeia averni Ponder & Clark, 1993
Beddomeia bellii Petterd, 1889
Beddomeia bowryensis Ponder & Clark, 1993
Beddomeia briansmithi Ponder & Clark, 1993
Beddomeia camensis Ponder & Clark, 1993
Beddomeia capensis Ponder & Clark, 1993
Beddomeia fallax Ponder & Clark, 1993
Beddomeia forthensis Ponder & Clark, 1993
Beddomeia franklandensis Ponder & Clark, 1993
Beddomeia franklinensis Ponder & Clark, 1993
Beddomeia fromensis Ponder & Clark, 1993
Beddomeia fultoni Ponder & Clark, 1993
Beddomeia gibba Ponder & Clark, 1993
Beddomeia hallae Petterd, 1889
Beddomeia hermansi Ponder & Clark, 1993
Beddomeia hullii Petterd, 1889
Beddomeia inflata Ponder & Clark, 1993
Beddomeia kershawi Ponder & Clark, 1993
Beddomeia kessneri Ponder & Clark, 1993
Beddomeia krybetes Ponder & Clark, 1993
Beddomeia launcestonensis (Johnston, 1879)
Beddomeia lodderae Petterd, 1889
Beddomeia mesibovi Ponder & Clark, 1993
Beddomeia minima Petterd, 1889
Beddomeia petterdi Ponder & Clark, 1993
Beddomeia pallida Ponder & Clark, 1993
Beddomeia paludinella Reeve, 1857
Beddomeia paludinella levenensis Ponder & Clark, 1993
Beddomeia paludinella paludinella Reeve, 1857
Beddomeia phasianella Ponder & Clark, 1993
Beddomeia protuberata Ponder & Clark, 1993
Beddomeia ronaldi Ponder & Clark, 1993
Beddomeia salmonis Ponder & Clark, 1993
Beddomeia tasmanica (Tenison-Woods, 1876)
Beddomeia topsiae Ponder & Clark, 1993
Beddomeia trochiformis Ponder & Clark, 1993
Beddomeia tumida Petterd, 1889
Beddomeia turnerae Ponder & Clark, 1993
Beddomeia waterhouseae Ponder & Clark, 1993
Beddomeia wilmotensis Ponder & Clark, 1993
Beddomeia wiseae Ponder & Clark, 1993
Beddomeia zeehanensis Ponder & Clark, 1993

References

 Ancey, C. F. (1898). Notes malacologiques. A – Observation sur les mollusques terrestres et fluviatiles recueillies dans ľIndo-Chine et particulièrement au Laos par Henri Counillon. B – Description ďespèces nouvelle du centre ďAfrique; C – Notes sur quelques coupes génériques ou sous-génériques de Mollusques. D – Description ďun mollusque méditerranéen nouveau. Bulletin du Musée ďHistoire Naturelle de Marseille. Série II 1(1): 125–150.

External links
 Petterd W.F. (1889). Contributions for a systematic catalogue of the aquatic shells of Tasmania. Papers and Proceedings of the Royal Society of Tasmania. (1888): 60-82, pls 1-4.
 Brazier, J. (1896). On the new genus Petterdiana. Papers & Proceedings of the Royal Society of Tasmania. 105
 

 
Gastropod genera
Taxonomy articles created by Polbot